Charef District is a district of Djelfa Province, Algeria.

Municipalities
The district is further divided into 3 municipalities:

Charef
El Guedid
Beni Yagoub

Districts of Djelfa Province